Zhumagaziyev is a surname. Notable people with the surname include:

Dauren Zhumagaziyev (born 1989), Kazakhstani wrestler
Nurbergen Zhumagaziyev (born 1990), Kazakh short track speed skater

Kazakh-language surnames